Several ships have borne the name Young William:

  was launched at Whitby in 1779. She was captured and recaptured in 1814 and was lost on Nargon Island in 1815.
  was launched at Nantes in 1791 and captured by the British. She served as a whaler from 1794 until 1810 when a French frigate captured and burnt her off Madagascar.
  was launched at Whitby in 1794. She made one voyage taking stores to Botany Bay. She then sailed to China, discovering or rediscovering several islands on the way. From China she carried a cargo to England for the British East India Company. Later, she made two voyages as a slave ship. She was wrecked in September 1802.

Merchant ships of the United Kingdom
Maritime history of Australia
Ship names